Ochna rufescens is a species of plant in the family Ochnaceae. It is endemic to Sri Lanka.

References

Flora of Sri Lanka
rufescens
Critically endangered plants
Taxonomy articles created by Polbot